The 1991 ABN AMRO World Tennis Tournament was a men's tennis tournament played on indoor carpet courts. It was the 19th edition of the event known that year as the ABN AMRO World Tennis Tournament, and was part of the ATP World Series of the 1991 ATP Tour. It took place at the Rotterdam Ahoy indoor sporting arena in Rotterdam, Netherlands, from 25 February through 3 March 1991. Unseeded Omar Camporese won the singles title.

The singles line up was headlined by Association of Tennis Professionals (ATP) No. 3, Australian Open runner-up, Philadelphia and Memphis winner Ivan Lendl, reigning Rome champion, ATP Comeback Player of the Year Thomas Muster, and Estoril titlist Emilio Sánchez. Also present were Wimbledon semifinalist Goran Ivanišević, Monte Carlo and Tel Aviv winner Andrei Chesnokov, Jonas Svensson, Jakob Hlasek and Karel Nováček.

Finals

Singles

 Omar Camporese defeated  Ivan Lendl 3–6, 7–6(7–4), 7–6(7–4)
It was Omar Camporese's 1st career title.

Doubles

 Patrick Galbraith /  Anders Järryd defeated  Steve DeVries /  David Macpherson 7–6, 6–2

References

External links
 Official website 
 Official website 
 ATP tournament profile
 ITF tournament edition details

 
ABN AMRO World Tennis Tournament
ABN AMRO World Tennis
ABN AMRO World Tennis
ABN AMRO World Tennis